Grippo is a surname. Notable people with the surname include:

 Angela Grippo, American neuroscientist
 Carlo Grippo (born 1955), Italian middle distance runner
 Charles Grippo, American playwright, author and producer
 Diego Lo Grippo (born 1978), Argentine-Italian basketball player
 Simone Grippo (born 1988), Swiss footballer
 Víctor Grippo (1936–2002), Argentine painter

See also
 Grippo's, snack-food manufacturer

Italian-language surnames